State Route 437 (SR 437, or Shelbyville Bypass) is a  state highway in Bedford County in the central part of the U.S. state of Tennessee. The route is a bypass of Shelbyville, around the northern and eastern parts of the city.

Route description

SR 437 begins at an interchange with US 231/SR 10/SR 82 (Florida Short Route) in the northern part of Shelbyville. It travels to the east-southeast and then curves to the south and has an intersection with SR 64 east of Shelbyville and meets its eastern terminus, an intersection with US 41A/SR 16 east of town. The entire route is a 2-lane highway.

History

In 2011, it was reported that the highway had opened to traffic.

Major intersections

See also
 
 
 List of state routes in Tennessee

References

437
Shelbyville, Tennessee
Transportation in Bedford County, Tennessee